Anchovy essence is a brown or pink, thick, oily sauce, consisting of pounded anchovies, spices such as black pepper or cayenne pepper, and sometimes wine. It is used as a flavoring for soups, sauces, and other dishes since at least the 19th century. It has been called a British equivalent of Asian fish sauce.

See also

References

Fish sauces

Umami enhancers
Anchovy dishes